Pleasant Joseph, known as Cousin Joe, (December 20, 1907 — October 2, 1989) was a New Orleans blues and jazz singer, famous for his 1940s recordings with Sidney Bechet and Mezz Mezzrow.

Life
He was born in Wallace, Louisiana, United States, and worked at Whitney Plantation throughout his childhood.

Until 1945, Cousin Joe toured Louisiana; that year he was asked to take part in the King Jazz recording sessions organized by Mezzrow and Bechet.

In the 1970s, Cousin Joe toured extensively throughout the UK and Europe, both individually and as part of the American Blues Legends '74 revue organised by Big Bear Music. He also recorded the album Gospel-Wailing, Jazz-Playing, Rock'n'Rolling, Soul-Shouting, Tap-Dancing Bluesman From New Orleans for Big Bear.

Cousin Joe died in his sleep from natural causes in New Orleans, at the age of 81. He was survived by his wife Irene Joseph, son Michael and his three grandchildren Rahsaan, Mignonne and Jarrell.

Autobiography
Cousin Joe : Blues from New Orleans / Pleasant "Cousin Joe" Joseph and Harriet J. Ottenheimer. Chicago : University of Chicago Press, 1987. xi, 227 p. : ill. ; 23 cm.

Partial discography
 1971 : Bad Luck Blues  (Black & Blue) with Jimmy Dawkins and Clarence "Gatemouth" Brown
 1973 : Cousin Joe From New Orleans (BluesWay)
 1974 : Gospel Wailing, Jazz Playing, Soul Shouting, Tap Dancing Bluesman from New Orleans (Big Bear Records)
 1974 : American Blues Legends '74 (Big Bear Records)
 1984 : Cousin Joe from New Orleans in his prime (Oldie Blues)
 1985 : Relaxin' in New Orleans [sound recording] / Cousin Joe. New Orleans, LA : Great Southern Records. 1 sound disc : analog, 33 rpm ; 12 in.
 1995 : Jumping at Jubilee [sound recording]. London : Sequel, NEM CD 749
 1996 : Blues Festival [sound recording]. {Laserlight Records}, NEW CD 17 105
 2003 : Magic Bostic - Bostic, Earl, 1913–1965 [sound recording] / Earl Bostic. Paris : Jazz Archives

Filmography
 2005 : DVD The Blues of Cousin Joe (live - 29 August 1984 in New Orleans)  (Storyville Films)

References

External links
Answers.com: Pleasant Joseph
Satchmo.com/cousinjoe/

1907 births
1989 deaths
Jazz musicians from New Orleans
Blues musicians from Louisiana
American blues pianists
American male pianists
American blues singers
American jazz pianists
American jazz singers
Singers from Louisiana
Savoy Records artists
Decca Records artists
Imperial Records artists
20th-century American singers
20th-century American pianists
People from St. John the Baptist Parish, Louisiana
20th-century American male musicians
American male jazz musicians
Black & Blue Records artists